Charles Hugh Smiley (September 6, 1903 – July 26, 1977) was an American astronomer and academic, and the author of a column on astronomy, “Planets and Stars” (Providence Journal, 1938–1957).  The main belt asteroid 1613 Smiley is named after him.  He was considered “one of the world’s leading authorities on eclipses.”

Biography
Born in Camden, Missouri, he attended UCLA and UC Berkeley, where he earned a mathematics degree.  He received an MA in mathematics from Berkeley (1925) and a PhD from the same university (1927).  He taught mathematics at the University of Illinois Urbana-Champaign (1927-9) and worked at the Royal Greenwich Observatory as a Guggenheim Fellow (1929–30).  He worked as a professor of mathematics at Brown University from 1930 onwards.  He was director of Ladd Observatory and served as chairman of the Department of Astronomy from 1938 until his retirement.

Smiley led expeditions to South America, Canada, Asia, and the US to study solar eclipses and observed the solar eclipse of July 20, 1963 from a U.S. Air Force F-104D Starfighter supersonic aircraft that was "racing the moon's shadow" at  extending the duration of totality. He also conducted several expeditions between 1947 and 1952 to study “atmospheric refraction at low angular altitudes.”   He also studied the Mayan calendar, and “was able to date the Mayan Codices of Dresden, Paris, and Madrid from astronomical dates which they contained.”

When 1570 Brunonia was discovered on October 9, 1948, by Sylvain Julien Victor Arend at the Royal Observatory of Belgium in Uccle, Belgium, Arend wrote to Smiley: — This planet is named in honor of Brown University, Providence, Rhode Island. ... Its astronomical history dates back to the transit of Venus in 1769, observed by Prof. Benjamin West. Two local streets are named Planet and Transit. The naming of the planet is also a tribute to the international reputation of Dr. Smiley.

References

External links 

  (see WorldCat, below)

American astronomers
1903 births
1977 deaths
University of California, Berkeley alumni